The 1952 All-Ireland Junior Hurling Championship was the 31st staging of the All-Ireland Junior Championship since its establishment by the Gaelic Athletic Association in 1912.

Kilkenny entered the championship as the defending champions, however, they were beaten by Dublin in the Leinster semi-final.

The All-Ireland final was played on 19 October 1952 at New Eltham in London, between Dublin and London, in what was their first meeting in a final in 15 years. Dublin won the match by 3-04 to 2-06 to claim their third championship title overall and a first title since 1937.

Results

All-Ireland Junior Hurling Championship

All-Ireland semi-finals

All-Ireland home final

All-Ireland final

Championship statistics

Miscellaneous

 Roscommon won the Connacht Championship for the first time ever.

References

Junior
All-Ireland Junior Hurling Championship